Neomycin is an aminoglycoside antibiotic that displays bactericidal activity against gram-negative aerobic bacilli and some anaerobic bacilli where resistance has not yet arisen. It is generally not effective against gram-positive bacilli and anaerobic gram-negative bacilli. Neomycin comes in oral and topical formulations, including creams, ointments, and eyedrops. Neomycin belongs to the aminoglycoside class of antibiotics that contain two or more amino sugars connected by glycosidic bonds.

Neomycin was discovered in 1949 by microbiologist Selman Waksman and his student Hubert Lechevalier at Rutgers University.  Neomycin received approval for medical use in 1952. Rutgers University was granted the patent for neomycin in 1957.

Discovery
Neomycin was discovered in 1949 by the microbiologist Selman Waksman and his student Hubert Lechevalier at Rutgers University. It is produced naturally by the bacterium Streptomyces fradiae. Synthesis requires specific nutrient conditions in either stationary or submerged aerobic conditions. The compound is then isolated and purified from the bacterium.

Medical uses
Neomycin is typically applied as a topical preparation, such as Neosporin (neomycin/polymyxin B/bacitracin). The antibiotic can also be administered orally, in which case it is usually combined with other antibiotics. Neomycin is not absorbed from the gastrointestinal tract and has been used as a preventive measure for hepatic encephalopathy and hypercholesterolemia. By killing bacteria in the intestinal tract, Neomycin keeps ammonia levels low and prevents hepatic encephalopathy, especially before gastrointestinal surgery.

Waksman and Lechevalier originally noted that neomycin was active against streptomycin-resistant bacteria as well as Mycobacterium tuberculosis, the causative agent for tuberculosis. Neomycin has also been used to treat small intestinal bacterial overgrowth. Neomycin is not administered via injection, as it is extremely nephrotoxic (damaging to kidney function) even when compared to other aminoglycosides. The exception is when neomycin is included, in small quantities, as a preservative in some vaccines – typically 25 μg per dose.

Spectrum
Similar to other aminoglycosides, neomycin has excellent activity against gram-negative bacteria and is partially effective against gram-positive bacteria. It is relatively toxic to humans, with allergic reactions noted as a common adverse reaction (see: hypersensitivity). Physicians sometimes recommend using antibiotic ointments without neomycin, such as Polysporin. The following represents minimum inhibitory concentration (MIC) susceptibility data for a few medically significant gram-negative bacteria.
 Enterobacter cloacae: >16 μg/ml
 Escherichia coli: 1 μg/ml
 Proteus vulgaris: 0.25 μg/ml

Side effects
In 2005–06, Neomycin was the fifth-most-prevalent allergen in patch test results (10.0%). It is also a known GABA gamma-Aminobutyric acid antagonist and can be responsible for seizures and psychosis. Like other aminoglycosides, neomycin has been shown to be ototoxic, causing tinnitus, hearing loss, and vestibular problems in a small number of patients. Patients with existing tinnitus or sensorineural hearing loss are advised to speak with a healthcare practitioner about the risks and side effects prior to taking this medication.

Molecular biology

Activity
Neomycin's antibacterial activity stems from its binding to the 30S subunit of the prokaryotic ribosome, where it inhibits prokaryotic translation of mRNA.

Neomycin also exhibits a high binding affinity for phosphatidylinositol 4,5-bisphosphate (PIP2), a phospholipid component of cell membranes.

Resistance
Neomycin resistance is conferred by either one of two kanamycin kinase genes. Genes conferring neomycin-resistance are commonly included in DNA plasmids used to establish stable mammalian cell lines expressing cloned proteins in culture. Many commercially available protein expression plasmids contain a neo-resistance gene as a selectable marker.

Biosynthetic pathway
Neomycin was first isolated from the Streptomyces fradiae and Streptomyces albogriseus in 1949 (NBRC 12773). Neomycin is a mixture of neomycin B (framycetin); and its epimer neomycin C, the latter component accounting for some 5–15% of the mixture. It is a basic compound that is most active with an alkaline reaction. It is also thermostable and soluble in water (while insoluble in organic solvents). Neomycin has good activity against gram-positive and gram-negative bacteria, but is ototoxic. Its use is thus restricted to the oral treatment of intestinal infections.

Neomycin B is composed of four linked moieties: D-neosamine, 2-deoxystreptamine (2-DOS), D-ribose, and L-neosamine.

Neomycin A, also called neamine, contains D-neosamine and 2-deoxystreptamine. Six genes are responsible for neamine biosynthesis: DOIS gene (btrC, neo7); L-glutamine:DOI aminotransferase gene (btrS, neo6); a putative glycosyltransferase gene (btrM, neo8); a putative aminotransferase (similar to glutamate-1-semialdehyde 2,1-aminomutase) gene (btrB, neo18); a putative alcohol dehydrogenase gene (btrE, neo5); and another putative dehydrogenase (similar to chorine dehydrogenase and related flavoproteins) gene (btrQ, neo11). A deacetylase acting to remove the acetyl group on N-acetylglucosamine moieties of aminoglycoside intermediates (Neo16) remains to be clarified (sequence similar to BtrD).

Next is the attachment of the D-ribose via ribosylation of neamine, using 5-phosphoribosyl-1-diphosphate (PRPP) as the ribosyl donor (BtrL, BtrP); glycosyltransferase (potential homologues RibF, LivF, Parf) gene (Neo15).

Neosamine B (L-neosamine B) is most likely biosynthesized in the same manner as the neosamine C (D-niosamine) in neamine biosynthesis, but with an additional epimerization step required to account for the presence of the epimeric neosamine B in neomycin B.

Neomycin C can undergo enzymatic synthesis from ribostamycin.

Composition
Standard grade neomycin is composed of several related compounds including neomycin A (neamine), neomycin B (framycetin), neomycin C, and a few minor compounds found in much lower quantities. Neomycin B is the most active component in neomycin followed by neomycin C and neomycin A. Neomycin A is an inactive degradation product of the C and B isomers. The quantities of these components in neomycin vary from lot-to-lot depending on the manufacturer and manufacturing process.

DNA binding
Aminoglycosides such as neomycin are known for their ability to bind to duplex RNA with high affinity. The association constant for neomycin with A-site RNA is in the 109 M−1 range. However, more than 50 years after its discovery, its DNA-binding properties were still unknown. Neomycin has been shown to induce thermal stabilization of triplex DNA, while having little or almost no effect on the B-DNA duplex stabilization. Neomycin was also shown to bind to structures that adopt an A-form structure, triplex DNA being one of them. Neomycin also includes DNA:RNA hybrid triplex formation.

References 

Aminoglycoside antibiotics
Cell culture reagents
DNA-binding substances
Otologicals